Everard de Ros (c. 1145 - c. 1183) was the lord of Hamlake, modern version: Helmsley.

Life
Originally a ward of Ranulph de Granville, he seems to have been wealthy as in 1176 he paid the then large sum of five hundred and twenty-six pounds as a fine for his lands, and other large amounts subsequently. He was the son of Robert de Ros and Sybil de Valoines. Everard de Ros married Rose Trusbut (in 1170 or 1171) with whom he had two sons, the oldest of which, Robert de Ros, became a Magna Carta surety.

Death
He died around 1186; he and his wife (both apparently great benefactors to various religious institutes) are buried in the church of Hunmanby.

References

English feudal barons
1145 births
1180s deaths
12th-century English nobility
Year of death uncertain
De Ros family